Streetwise is the debut studio album by American classical pianist Richard Kastle, released on March 5, 1991 by Virgin Records. The album has a warning label that reads: "Parental Advisory: This album contains classical music, no lyrics whatsoever." The musicians debut album was also a part of a larger scheme by Virgin Records to seek out and develop a new and younger audience for classical music. Record companies, in the early 1990s, used innovative and hip marketing techniques in an effort to attract younger audiences to classical music.

Inception of the album
Kastle did not want to record an album of short works, mostly for the piano.  He insisted that his first album feature the 25 minute "Royce Concerto" with an orchestra. The record company maintained that Kastle's first album needed to break even, at least, and offered to guarantee a second release if he recorded shorter works for the first album, split evenly between classics and newer Kastle compositions.

Track listing
 Hungarian Rhapsody No. 2 - Franz Liszt
 Jesu, Joy of Man's Desiring - Johann Sebastian Bach
 Batcave at Dusk - Richard Kastle
 Piano Concerto No. 4, ii - Richard Kastle
 Fantasy in F# - Richard Kastle
 Sonata in A - Wolfgang Amadeus Mozart
 Sonata Pathetique ii - Ludwig van Beethoven
 Rhapsody in Blue - George Gershwin
 Atlantis - Richard Kastle

Credits
 Executive Producer: Roger Holdredge
 Produced by Steve Barnett
 Engineered by Preston Smith
 Orchestrated by Richard Kastle
 Conducted by Steve Barnett
 Art Direction: Melanie Nissen
 Design: Steve J. Gerdes
 Photography: Daniel Peebles

String Players: Romuald Teco (Concert Master), Julie Ayer, Carolyn Daws, Henley Daws, Roger Frisch, Thomas Kornacker(Principal Second Violin), Frank Lee, Carl Nashan, John Tartaglia (Principal Viola), Tamas Strasser, Peter Howard (Principal Cello),
Joshua Koestenbaum.

References

External links
 Official website
 Streetwise Gallery

1991 albums
Richard Kastle albums
Virgin Records albums